George Anderson may refer to:

Arts and entertainment
 George Frederick Anderson (1793–1876), British violinist and Master of the Queen's Music
 George Edward Anderson (1860–1928), American photographer
 George Anderson (actor) (1886–1948), American actor
 George Anderson (musician), English bass guitar player with Shakatak
 George Anderson (Peyton Place), fictional character on the television drama Peyton Place

Military 
 George T. Anderson (1824–1901), American Confederate general
 George B. Anderson (1831–1862), American Confederate general
 George Wayne Anderson (1839–1906), officer in the Confederate States Army
 George Whelan Anderson Jr. (1906–1992), American admiral and diplomat
 George K. Anderson (fl. 1970s–1990s), American air force major general

Politics and law

United Kingdom
 George Anderson (accountant-general) (1760–1796), English accountant-general to the Board of Control
 George William Anderson (1791–1857), British colonial governor
 George Anderson (MP) (1819–1896), British politician, MP for Glasgow
 George Knox Anderson (1854–1941), British politician, MP for Canterbury

United States
 George Anderson (Mississippi politician) (1856–1926) 
 George Edwin Anderson (1891–1961), American businessman and politician
 George Washington Anderson (1832–1902), United States Representative from Missouri
 George A. Anderson (1853–1896), United States Representative from Illinois
 George W. Anderson (judge) (1861–1938), American lawyer and federal judge
 George Wayne Anderson (politician) (1863–1922), American jurist, Virginia state senator
 G. Ross Anderson (1929–2020), United States federal judge

Elsewhere
 George Campbell Anderson (active 1831–1877), Bahamian judge in the Bahamas, Ceylon, and the Leeward Islands
 George William Anderson (Canadian politician) (1836–1909), English-born farmer, baker and political figure in British Columbia
 George Anderson (Australian politician) (1844–1919), New South Wales politician
 George James Anderson (1860–1935), New Zealand Member of Parliament

Religion
 George Anderson (minister) (1677–1756), Scottish clergyman
 George Nathanael Anderson (1883–1953), American Lutheran pastor
 George Wishart Anderson (1913–2002), British theologian
 H. George Anderson (born 1932), American bishop of the Evangelical Lutheran Church in America

Sports

Association football (soccer)
 Geordie Anderson (fl. 1892–1904), Scottish footballer (Blackburn Rovers, Blackpool FC)
 George Anderson (footballer, born 1877) (1877–1930), Scottish footballer (Kilmarnock FC, national team)
 George Anderson (footballer, born 1879) (1879–1962), English footballer (Birmingham FC, Brentford FC)
 George Anderson (footballer, born 1887) (1887–1956), English football player (Sunderland AFC, Aberdeen FC) and manager (Dundee FC)
 George Anderson (soccer executive) (1890–1985), Canadian soccer executive
 George Anderson (footballer, born 1891) (1891–1959), English footballer (Manchester United)
 George Anderson (Canadian soccer) (1901–?), Canadian soccer player
 George Anderson (footballer, born 1904) (1904–1974), Scottish footballer (Norwich City, Bury FC, Huddersfield Town, Mansfield Town)
 George Anderson (footballer, born 1953), Scottish footballer (Morton, Airdrieonians)
 George Anderson (New Zealand footballer), New Zealand international football (soccer) player

Other sports
 George Anderson (cricketer) (1826–1902), English cricketer
 George G. Anderson (1839–1884), Scottish mountaineer
 George Anderson (cyclist) (1883–1975), British Olympic cyclist
 George P. Anderson (1885–1958), Australian rules footballer
 George Anderson (Australian footballer) (1886–1976), Australian rules footballer
 George Anderson (baseball) (1889–1962), American baseball player
 Sparky Anderson (George Lee Anderson, 1934–2010), American baseball manager
 George Anderson (sprinter) (1943–2013), American sprinter

Others 
 George Anderson (mathematician) (fl. 1736–1740), English mathematician
 George Anderson (educator) (1876–1943), British schoolteacher and educational administrator in India
 George Anderson (criminal) (1880–1925), American bank robber

See also
 George Andersen (1900–1965), Danish-American lawyer